Nina Crulicovschi (born September 24, 1951, Shumikha, Kurgan Oblast, RSFSR) is an easy listening singer from the Republic of Moldova.

She was born in a family of deported Moldovans, in the Kurgan Oblast of the Russian Soviet Federative Socialist Republic. After returning in Moldova, she studied at the "Ștefan Neaga" secondary music school in Chișinău (1968–1972), where she was a student of Loghin Țurcanu.

Nina worked in many music bands and orchestras, including: "Fluieraș" (1973–1975) and "Lăutarii" (1975–1976) orchestras, "Orizont" (1977–1979), "Bucuria" (1979–1982), and "Contemporanul" (1983–1989) bands of the National Philharmonic of Moldova. She recorded easy listening songs at Radio Moldova. Her discography includes:
 Steaua polară
 Steaua iubirii
 Laudă soarelui
 Te aștept
 Of, leliță Mărioară
 Nu mă plânge, bade
 Strigături moldovenești

Nina was also an actress, starring, among others, in Chipul tău (Telefilm-Chișinău, 1984). Since 1997, she works at the "Al. Davilla" Theatre in Bucharest.

Nina Crulicovschi took part at the 1981 "Zorii Crimeei" Festival, and received the "Master of Arts" order in 1993. She is married with no children.

References

Bibliography

Further reading 
 
 
 
 
 

Moldovan television actresses
20th-century Moldovan women singers
1951 births
Living people
Moldovan stage actors
20th-century Moldovan actresses